The King is an album by saxophonist/composer Benny Carter recorded in 1976 and released by the Pablo label.

Reception

AllMusic reviewer Scott Yanow stated "The great Benny Carter was so much in demand as an arranger/composer in the studios that for 15 years, starting in the early '60s, he rarely recorded or performed in jazz settings, instead choosing to concentrate on writing movie scores. ... As The King (his first small-group session since 1966) proves, the masterful altoist had not lost a thing through the years. ... Benny Carter is in masterful form, stretching out on eight of his own compositions and showing that his name always has to be ranked near the top of jazz improvisers, whether one is considering the 1930s or the 1990s".

Track listing
All compositions by Benny Carter except where noted
 "A Walkin' Thing" – 6:18
 "My Kind of Trouble Is You" (Carter, Paul Vandervoort II) – 4:35
 "Easy Money" – 6:16
 "Blue Star" – 8:05
 "I Still Love Him So" – 6:42
 "Green Wine" (Carter, Leonard Feather) – 6:45
 "Malibu" – 4:25
 "Blues in D Flat" – 7:56

Personnel 
Benny Carter – alto saxophone
Milt Jackson – vibraphone
Joe Pass – guitar
Tommy Flanagan – piano
 John B. Williams – bass
Jake Hanna – drums

References 

1976 albums
Benny Carter albums
Pablo Records albums
Albums produced by Norman Granz